Albrecht Glockendon the Younger (c.1500–1545) was a Nuremberg-based miniaturist and woodcutter. The son of painter and printer Georg Glockendon, his work reflects the influence of both his brother, the illuminator Nikolaus Glockendon, and of Albrecht Dürer.

Notes

References
 Bryan, Michael, Dictionary of painters and engravers: biographical and critical, Vol. 1, George Bell and Sons, 1886.
 Wood, Christopher, Albrecht Altdorfer and the origins of landscape, University of Chicago Press, 1993.
 Smith, Jeffrey Chipps. "Glockendon." In Grove Art Online. Oxford Art Online,  (accessed December 26, 2011; subscription required).
 Entry for Albrecht Glockendon the Younger in the Union List of Artist Names

16th-century German painters
German male painters
Portrait miniaturists
Woodcut designers
1500 births
1545 deaths